James Cecil Yanwube (born December 25, 1962) is a Ghanaian politician and member of the Sixth Parliament of the Fourth Republic of Ghana representing the Tatale-Sanguli Constituency in the  Northern Region on the ticket of the New Patriotic Party. He is currently occupying a position as Tatale/Sanguli District  chief executive in the northern region of Ghana.

Personal life 
Yanwube is a Christian (Baptist). He is married (with four children).

Early life and education 
Yanwube was born on December 25, 1962. He hails from Sheini, a town in the Northern Region of Ghana. He entered Lincolnshire and Humberhshide, London, UK and obtained his master's degree in Information Technology in 2000. He attended Fellowship Chartered Certified Accountant in 1997. He also attended Associates of Cost and Management Accountants and Institute of Chartered Accountants (Ghana) in 2000.

Politics 
Yanwube is a member of the New Patriotic Party (NPP). In 2012, he contested for the Tatale-Sanguli seat on the ticket of the NPP sixth parliament of the fourth republic and won.

Employment 
He is a Senior Lecturer/Dean of Graduate School, Wisconsin International University College, Accra.

He works as an accountant and financial officer.

References 

1962 births
Living people
Ghanaian MPs 2017–2021
New Patriotic Party politicians